Barras is a hamlet close to the River Belah, about  south-east of Brough, Cumbria, England.

Until the creation of the new county of Cumbria, Barras was situated at the eastern edge of the historic county of Westmorland.

From 1861 until 1962 it was served by Barras railway station on the Stainmore railway line between Kirkby Stephen and Barnard Castle.

References

Hamlets in Cumbria
Eden District